Santa Maria Murella is a Roman Catholic church located just outside of the town of Montasola, in the province of Rieti, region of Lazio, Italy.

History 
The church was built using Ancient Roman ruins, and was located at the site of the Roman city of Laurum. The name Murella derives from the former Roman walls from which the stones for the church were derived. It is suspected that the site once housed a pagan temple. The first construction was likely in the 12th-century, although inscription on the facade date to the 14th-century; the building served as parish church a that time. The facade has some Romanesque sculpted carving in bas-relief. Flanking the mullioned window in the facade are two lions, with an eagle above.

A major restoration was pursued in 1693, patronized by Angelo Bonelli. Many of the canvases from this time have been moved to the present parish church of Santi Pietro e Tommaso. A number of burials occurred in the walls of the church. The church property is still used for burials.

References

Roman Catholic churches in Lazio
Romanesque architecture in Lazio
Maria Murella
Churches in the province of Rieti